The Women's keirin competition at the 2022 UCI Track Cycling World Championships was held on 16 October 2022.

Results

First round
The first round was started at 12:08. The first two riders from each qualified for the second round, all other riders moved to the repechages.

Heat 1

Heat 3

Heat 5

Heat 2

Heat 4

First round repechage
The first round repechage was started at 12:39. The first two riders from each heat qualified for the quarterfinals.

Heat 1

Heat 3

Heat 2

Heat 4

Quarterfinals
The quarterfinals were started at 14:15. The first four riders from each heat qualified for the semifinals.

Heat 1

Heat 3

Heat 2

Semifinals
The semifinals were started at 15:31. The first three riders in each heat qualified for the final, all other riders raced for places 7 to 12.

Heat 1

Heat 2

Finals
The finals were started at 16:04.

Small final

Final

References

Women's keirin